Descendants of Louis XIII may refer to:

 Descendants of Louis XIV
 Descendants of Philippe I, Duke of Orléans